Bruce Gillmer (born August 6, 1963) is an American television producer/music executive known for executive producing the MTV Europe Music Awards, often called the EMAs, in 2008, 2009, 2010, 2011, 2012, 2013, 2014 and 2015, as well as other music and entertainment events and award shows.

Career
Gillmer got his start as a Talent Coordinator for MTV in 1987, working on shows like Yo! MTV Raps, Headbangers Ball, The Jon Stewart Show and MTV Spring Break. He was then promoted to Senior Vice President of Music and Talent Relations for VH1, where he led the Music and Talent department on all music-driven shows, events and initiatives.  Gillmer was deeply involved with the development and production of VH1 Divas, VH1 Hip Hop Honors, VH1 Fashion Awards, Behind the Music, The Concert for New York City, and a variety of other shows, series and events.

Bruce Gillmer later became Executive Vice President of Talent and Music Programming / Events for Viacom International Media Networks (VIMN), where he led  strategic partnerships within the international music industry and was responsible for music and celebrity talent participation around international programming and events, including the MTV EMAs, the Mnet Asian Music Awards, the VMAJs and MTV World Stage.

Filmography
Where Are They Now? on VH1 - 2000
VH1 Divas Duets - 2003
Aftermath: The Station Fire Five Years Later - 2008
MTV Europe Music Awards 2011 - 2011
MTV Europe Music Awards 2012 - 2012
MTV Europe Music Awards 2013 - 2013 
MTV Europe Music Awards 2014 - 2014 
MTV Europe Music Awards 2015 - 2015

References

External links
 
 
 
 Bruce Gillmer at The New York Times
 Bruce Gillmer at Variety
 Bruce Gillmer at Barnes & Noble
 Bruce Gillmer Official Website

1963 births
American film producers
American television producers
Living people